Cardston-Chief Mountain was a provincial electoral district in Alberta, Canada, mandated to return a single member to the Legislative Assembly of Alberta using the first-past-the-post method of voting from 1993 to 1997.

History
The Cardston-Chief Mountain electoral district was created in 1993 when the boundaries for Cardston were re-drawn after Pincher Creek-Crowsnest moved south.

The riding was merged with Taber-Warner in 1997 to form the riding Cardston-Taber-Warner.

Election results

1993 general election

See also
List of Alberta provincial electoral districts

References

Further reading

External links
Elections Alberta
The Legislative Assembly of Alberta

Former provincial electoral districts of Alberta